Garcinia madruno, the charichuela, is a fruit-producing tree species from the rainforests of Central and South America. The leaves are dark green and leathery. The fruit looks like a shriveled droopy lemon and has a similar rind, so is sometimes called a lemon drop mangosteen. The interior is soft white pulp and has a popular, slightly citrusy taste people have compared to a sweet santol fruit or lemony cotton candy. The species was formerly included in the genus Rheedia, which has since been absorbed into Garcinia, as Rheedias species are now known as "new world mangosteens".

Cultivation
Garcinia madruno is well adapted to a wide variety of soils, tolerating even poor soils or heavy clay. It is a slow grower and takes about 5 to 7 years to fruit. When young, it must be protected from frosts and it will not fruit in cold areas.

Distribution
The fruit is not very well known outside of South America and a few backyard growers in South Florida.

References

External links

madruno